True Believers is the fourth studio album by American country music artist Darius Rucker, and his third in the country genre. It was released on May 21, 2013, through Capitol Records Nashville.

Critical reception

True Believers has received positive reception from the music critics. Fred Thomas of Allmusic told that "the thing is, with a few songs you have to be listening pretty closely to differentiate the country affectations from the pop songwriting Rucker's been doing all along." Music Is My Oxygen'''s Rob Burkhardt called the work "a set of highly sing-able, highly memorable tunes, loaded with ear-worm hooks and virtually no mis-steps." At The Oakland Press, Gary Graff found that on this release that Rucker has made "something deeper than the annual ledger-satisfying exercises at which most country acts excel", which he "gets into some genuinely deep subject matter here". Roughstock's Matt Bjorke affirmed that the album "feels solid and ready for the spotlight or setlist." At USA Today, Brian Mansfield wrote that "Rucker sings plenty about driving, spring break and the radio". Billy Dukes of Taste of Country wrote that the release "suffers from a sonic sameness that stays within Rucker’s comfort zone", and noted that "there's a whiff of formula [...] something every artist should work to stay ahead of."

Commercial performanceTrue Believers'' debuted at No. 1 on the Top Country Albums chart and No. 2 on the Billboard 200, with 83,000 sold for the week.  This was Rucker's third top-placing studio album in a row. The album was certified Gold by the RIAA on February 12, 2014. , the album has sold 575,400 copies in the United States

Track listing

Personnel

 David Angell – strings
 Tom Bukovac – acoustic guitar, electric guitar
 John Catchings – strings
 J.T. Corenflos – electric guitar 
 Sheryl Crow – vocals on "Love Without You"
 Eric Darken – percussion
 David Davidson – strings
 Aubrey Haynie – fiddle, mandolin
 Dave Haywood – background vocals on "Wagon Wheel"
 Wes Hightower – background vocals
 Mallary Hope – vocals on "I Will Love You Still"
 Mike Johnson – dobro, pedal steel guitar
 Charles Kelley – background vocals on "Wagon Wheel"
 Gayle Mayes – background vocals
 Greg Morrow – drums
 Gordon Mote – Hammond B-3 organ, piano, Wurlitzer
 Russ Pahl – pedal steel guitar
 Angela Primm – background vocals 
 Michael Rhodes – bass guitar
 Frank Rogers – keyboards
 Darius Rucker – lead vocals 
 Hillary Scott – background vocals on "Wagon Wheel"
 Russell Terrell – background vocals
 Ilya Toshinsky – acoustic guitar, mandolin
 Kris Wilkinson – strings

Charts and certifications

Weekly charts

Year-end charts

Singles

Certifications

References

2013 albums
Darius Rucker albums
Capitol Records albums
Albums produced by Frank Rogers (record producer)